Stefan Th. Gries (['ʃtɛfɐn 'tʰoːmɐs 'ɡʁiːs]) is (full) professor of linguistics in the Department of Linguistics at the University of California, Santa Barbara (UCSB), Honorary Liebig-Professor of the Justus-Liebig-Universität Giessen (since September 2011), and since 1 April 2018 also Chair of English Linguistics (Corpus Linguistics with a focus on quantitative methods, 25%) at the Justus-Liebig-Universität Giessen.

Career
Gries earned his M.A. and Ph.D. degrees at the University of Hamburg, Germany, in 1998 and 2000. He was at the Department of Business Communication and Information Science of the University of Southern Denmark at Sønderborg (1998–2005), first as a lecturer, then as assistant professor and tenured associate professor; during that time, he also taught English linguistics part-time at the Department of British and American Studies of the University of Hamburg. In 2005, he spent 10 months as a visiting scholar in the Psychology Department of the Max Planck Institute for Evolutionary Anthropology in Leipzig, Germany, before he accepted a position at UCSB, starting November 1, 2005.
Gries was a visiting professor at the 2007, 2011, 2013, 2015, and 2019 LSA Linguistic Institutes at Stanford University, the University of Colorado at Boulder, the University of Michigan, Ann Arbor, the University of Chicago, and the University of California, Davis. He was also a Visiting Chair (2013–2017) of the Centre for Corpus Approaches to Social Science at Lancaster University and the Leibniz Professor (spring semester 2017) at the Research Academy Leipzig of the Leipzig University.,

Research
Methodologically, Gries is a quantitative corpus linguist at the intersection of corpus linguistics, cognitive linguistics, and computational linguistics, who uses a variety of different statistical methods to investigate linguistic topics such as morphophonology (the formation of morphological blends), syntax (syntactic alternations), the syntax-lexis interface (collostructional analysis), and semantics (polysemy, antonymy, and near synonymy in English and Russian) and corpus-linguistic methodology (corpus homogeneity and comparisons, association and dispersion measures, n-gram identification and exploration, and other quantitative methods), as well as first and second/foreign language acquisition. Occasionally and mainly collaboratively, he also uses experimental methods (acceptability judgments, sentence completion, priming, self-paced reading times, and sorting tasks). Much of his recent work involves the open source software R.

Theoretically, he is a cognitively oriented usage-based linguist (with an interest in Construction Grammar) in the wider sense of seeking explanations in terms of cognitive processes without being a cognitive linguist in the narrower sense of following any one particular cognitive-linguistic theory. The researchers who have influenced his work most are R. Harald Baayen, Douglas Biber, Nick C. Ellis, Adele E. Goldberg, and Michael Tomasello.

Publications

Books written by Gries
 Stefan Th. Gries. Multifactorial Analysis in Corpus Linguistics: A Study of Particle Placement. Open Linguistics. New York: Continuum, 2003.  (hardback); 
 Stefan Th. Gries. Statistik für Sprachwissenschaftler. Studienbücher zur Linguistik, vol 13. Göttingen: Vandenhoeck & Ruprecht, 2008. .
 Stefan Th. Gries. Quantitative Corpus Linguistics with R: A Practical Introduction. New York: Routledge, 2009.  (hardback); 
 Stefan Th. Gries. Quantitative Corpus Linguistics with R: A Practical Introduction. 2nd rev. & ext. ed. New York: Routledge, 2016. ; .
 Stefan Th. Gries. Statistics for Linguistics with R: A Practical Introduction. Berlin: Walter de Gruyter, 2009. .
Stefan Th. Gries. Statistics for Linguistics with R: A Practical Introduction. 2nd rev. & ext. ed. Berlin: Walter de Gruyter, 2013.  (also translated into Korean, Chinese, and Brazilian Portuguese).
 Stefan Th. Gries. Statistics for Linguistics with R: A Practical Introduction. 3rd rev. & ext. ed. Berlin: Walter de Gruyter, 2021. .
 Stefan Th. Gries. Ten Lectures on Quantitative Approaches in Cognitive Linguistics: Corpus-Linguistic, Experimental, and Statistical Applications. Leiden: Brill, 2017. 
 Stefan Th. Gries. Ten Lectures on Corpus Linguistics with R: Applications for usage-based and psycholinguistic research. Leiden: Brill, 2019.

Books coedited by Gries
Stefan Th. Gries and Anatol Stefanowitsch, eds. Corpora in Cognitive Linguistics: Corpus-Based Approaches to Syntax and Lexis. Trends in Linguistics. Studies and Monographs. Berlin and New York: Mouton De Gruyter, 2006.  (hardback);  (paperback). 
Anatol Stefanowitsch and Stefan Th. Gries, eds. Corpus-Based Approaches to Metaphor and Metonymy. Trends in Linguistics: Studies and Monographs. Berlin: Walter de Gruyter, 2006.  (hardback);  (paperback). 
Stefan Th. Gries, Stefanie Wulff, and Mark Davies, eds. Corpus-Linguistic Applications: Current Studies, New Directions. Amsterdam and New York: Rodopi, 2010. .
Mario Brdar, Stefan Th. Gries and Milena Žic Fuchs, eds. Cognitive Linguistics: Convergence and Expansion. Human Cognitive Processing, vol. 32. Amsterdam and Philadelphia: John Benjamins, 2011. .
Stefan Th. Gries and Dagmar Divjak, eds. Frequency Effects in Language Learning and Processing. Trends in Linguistics. Studies and Monographs. Berlin and Boston: Mouton De Gruyter, 2012. .
Dagmar Divjak and Stefan Th. Gries, eds. Frequency Effects in Language Representation. Trends in Linguistics. Studies and Monographs. Berlin and Boston: Mouton De Gruyter, 2012. .
Jiyoung Yoon and Stefan Th. Gries, eds. Corpus-Based Approaches to Construction Grammar. Constructional Approaches to Language, vol. 19. Amsterdam and Philadelphia: John Benjamins, 2016. .
Magali Paquot and Stefan Th. Gries, eds. A Practical Handbook of Corpus Linguistics. Berlin and New York: Springer, 2020. .

Others
Gries has co-edited a special issue of the Brazilian Journal of Applied Linguistics. He has (co-)written articles in Cognitive Linguistics International Journal of Corpus Linguistics,) as well as in other peer-reviewed journals. He was the co-founder (2005), co-editor-in-chief (2005-2010), then editor-in-chief (2010-2015) of the international peer-reviewed journal Corpus Linguistics and Linguistic Theory (of which he now is the General Editor, 2016-), co-editor-in-chief of Journal of Research Design and Statistics in Linguistics and Communication Science, and associate co-editor of Cognitive Linguistic Studies, and performs editorial functions for the international peer-reviewed journals Brazilian Journal of Applied Linguistics,  Cognitive Linguistics, Cognitive Semantics, CogniTextes, Constructions, Constructions and Frames, Corpora, Corpus Linguistics Research, Corpus Pragmatics, Glottotheory, International Journal of Corpus Linguistics, International Journal of Learner Corpus Research, Journal of Language Modelling, Journal of Second Language Studies, Language and Cognition, Linguistic Approaches to Bilingualism Linguistics and Literature Review, Research Methods in Applied Linguistics, Forum for Linguistic Studies, Ampersand, and Linguistics and Literature Review as well as for the book series 'Cognitive Linguistics and Practice' (published by John Benjamins), 'Corpora and Language in Use' (published by Louvain University Press), and 'Explorations in English Language and Linguistics' (published by universities in Croatia and Bosnia & Herzegovina).

Notes

References

External links
Personal web page
Web page at the Department of Linguistics at the University of California, Santa Barbara

Living people
Linguists
Corpus linguists
Cognitive linguists
University of California, Santa Barbara faculty
1970 births